A by-election was held for the New South Wales Legislative Assembly seat of Charlestown on Saturday 18 November 1972. It was triggered by the death of Jack Stewart.

Dates

Results

Jack Stewart died.

See also
Electoral results for the district of Charlestown
List of New South Wales state by-elections

References

New South Wales state by-elections
1972 elections in Australia
1970s in New South Wales
November 1972 events in Australia